Elections to Ballymoney Borough Council were held on 18 May 1977 on the same day as the other Northern Irish local government elections. The election used three district electoral areas to elect a total of 16 councillors.

Election results

Note: "Votes" are the first preference votes.

Districts summary

|- class="unsortable" align="centre"
!rowspan=2 align="left"|Ward
! % 
!Cllrs
! % 
!Cllrs
! %
!Cllrs
! %
!Cllrs
! %
!Cllrs
!rowspan=2|TotalCllrs
|- class="unsortable" align="center"
!colspan=2 bgcolor="" | UUP
!colspan=2 bgcolor="" | DUP
!colspan=2 bgcolor="" | SDLP
!colspan=2 bgcolor="" | Alliance
!colspan=2 bgcolor="white"| Others
|-
|align="left"|Area A
|37.6
|2
|bgcolor="#D46A4C"|42.5
|bgcolor="#D46A4C"|2
|0.0
|0
|10.2
|0
|9.7
|0
|4
|-
|align="left"|Area B
|bgcolor="40BFF5"|37.1
|bgcolor="40BFF5"|3
|18.1
|1
|30.6
|3
|0.0
|0
|14.2
|1
|8
|-
|align="left"|Area C
|7.6
|0
|0.0
|0
|0.0
|0
|22.0
|0
|bgcolor="#DDDDDD"|70.4
|bgcolor="#DDDDDD"|3
|4
|-
|- class="unsortable" class="sortbottom" style="background:#C9C9C9"
|align="left"| Total
|29.4
|5
|19.2
|3
|15.1
|3
|8.3
|1
|28.0
|4
|16
|-
|}

Districts results

Area A

1973: 1 x DUP, 1 x UUP, 1 x Independent Unionist, 1 x Independent
1977: 2 x DUP, 2 x UUP
1973-1977 Change: DUP gain from Independent, Independent Unionist joins UUP

Area B

1973: 3 x UUP, 2 x SDLP, 2 x Independent Unionist, 1 x Independent Nationalist
1977: 3 x UUP, 3 x SDLP, 1 x DUP, 1 x Independent
1973-1977 Change: DUP, SDLP and Independent gain from UUP (two seats) and Independent Nationalist, Independent Unionists (two seats) join UUP

Area C

1973: 2 x Independent, 1 x Alliance, 1 x Independent Unionist
1977: 2 x Independent, 1 x Alliance, 1 x Independent Unionist
1973-1977 Change: No change

References

Ballymoney Borough Council elections
Ballymoney